Without a Home is a 2013 album by Nicholas Altobelli.

Track listing

Personnel

Musicians
 Nicholas Altobelli - vocals, acoustic guitars
 Salim Nourallah - bass, backing vocals
 John Dufilho - drums, percussion
 Becky Middleton - keys, piano, backing vocals
 Joe Reyes - electric guitars
 Paul Slavens - accordion

Production
Salim Nourallah – producer, engineer, mixer
Carl Saff – mastering
Nicholas Altobelli & Marianne Reed – photography
Trey Carmichael – design

References

2013 albums